Shakti: The Power is a 2002 Indian Hindi-language action thriller film directed by Krishna Vamsi and starring Karisma Kapoor, Nana Patekar, Sanjay Kapoor and Shah Rukh Khan with Deepti Naval, Ritu Shivpuri, Anupam Shyam and Prakash Raj in supporting roles. Aishwarya Rai makes a special appearance in a song. The film is a remake of 1998 Telugu film Anthahpuram, which was based on the real-life story of Betty Mahmoody. The original story of real life escape of Betty Mahmoody is depicted in the film Not Without My Daughter (1991) which itself was based on Betty Mahmoody's book of the same name.

Shakti: The Power is considered to be one of Karisma Kapoor's career-best performances; with her and Patekar's performances being lauded by fans and critics. Despite this, it did not fare well commercially as expected. 

At the 48th Filmfare Awards, Shakti: The Power received 2 nominations – Best Actress (Kapoor) and Best Villain (Patekar).

Plot
Nandini is a carefree young woman who lives happily with her guardian in Canada. She is introduced to Shekhar and they get married quite spontaneously and are expecting a child soon. One day, Shekhar learns that his family is in trouble, back in India. Nandini is confused as she believed that he was an orphan, but Shekhar explains to her that his family belongs to an extremely feudal society, and unable to bear the factions and violence in the community, he migrated to Canada. They decide to travel to India in order to assess the situation.

The couple arrives in Shekhar's home town in Bihar, where his father Narasimha is an influential man with rustic habits, who doesn't find Nandini to be traditional enough for his son. Nandini is uncomfortable with the casual approach to violence that she and her son Raja see in the household. Narasimha's wife is a kind-hearted person who takes care of Shekhar, Nandini and Raja. She requests them to remain in India for a few more days in order to celebrate Shekhar's birthday, and during this time Shekhar is killed by Narasimha's rivals. Nandini is distraught and tries to take her son Raja away from this madness and violence, but Narasimha stops her from doing so. He says Raja must be raised in a traditional way in order to avenge his father's death, and if needed Nandini can leave the town by leaving her son behind. Nandini refuses to allow this and, with the help of Narasimha's family members, she escapes from the house with her son. Jai Singh, a petty thief and a drifter, helps Nandini evade Narasimha's man in order to board a train to Jaipur. Jai is killed in the midst of violence whilst trying to protect Nandini and her son. Narasimha continues to pursue Nandini, but ultimately allows her and the child Raja to leave, after emotionally interacting with his grandson.

Cast
Nana Patekar as Narasimha, Shekhar's father.
Karishma Kapoor as Nandini, Shekhar's wife.
Sanjay Kapoor as Shekhar, Nandini's late husband.
Shahrukh Khan as Jai Singh, a drifter who helps Nandini.
Deepti Naval as Shekhar's mother
Divya Dutta as Shekhar's sister
Rajshree Solanki as Shekhar's sister
Ritu Shivpuri as Kamli, Shekhar's sister.
Prakash Raj 
Vijay Raaz as Beeja
Tiku Talsania as Nandini's uncle
Jaspal Bhatti as Nandini's uncle
Chandrakant Gokhale as Narasimha's father.
Jai Gidwani as Raja, Nandini's and Shekhar's son.
Anupam Shyam as Maharaj, Narasimha's half brother.
Aishwarya Rai in the song "Ishq Kamina" as Jai Singh's Dream Girl. (special appearance)
Prabhu Deva in a special appearance in song Dumroo Baja Re.
Ganesh Acharya in song Dumroo Baja Re.
Vijay Gupta as Narasimha's Henchman
Chris Ippolito as Dancer
Rocky Verma as Goon

Production
The film was produced by then-retired actress Sridevi (Sanjay Kapoor's sister-in-law) under the banner Sridevi Productions and was supposed to be her comeback film, but she had to find a replacement when she found out she was pregnant. She initially offered her role to Kajol, but she rejected it so Karisma Kapoor was signed instead. Fardeen Khan was the original choice for Sanjay Kapoor's role and the film was originally titled Vaapsi.

Music
Songs were mainly composed by Ismail Darbar and penned by Mehboob, but one song was composed by Anu Malik and written by Sameer - "Ishq Kameena".

Box office
It is the 13th-highest-grossing film of 2002 worldwide.

India

It opened on Friday, 20 September 2002, across 285 screens, and earned  nett on its opening day. It grossed  nett in its opening weekend, and had a first week of  nett. The film earned a total of  nett, and was declared "Flop" by Box Office India. It is the 20th-highest-grossing film of 2002 in India.

Overseas
It had an opening weekend of $565,000 (2.74 crore) and went on to gross $770,000 (3.73 crore) in its first week. The film earned a total of $1.35 million (6.54 crore) at the end of its theatrical run. Overseas, It is the 5th-highest-grossing film of 2002.

Awards

References

External links

2002 films
2000s Hindi-language films
2002 action drama films
Hindi remakes of Telugu films
Films about women in India
Films directed by Krishna Vamsi
Films scored by Ismail Darbar
Films scored by Mani Sharma
Indian action drama films
Films shot in Rajasthan
Films about dysfunctional families
Films about murder
Indian action thriller films
2002 action thriller films